Susan Jean Silver (born July 17, 1958) is an American music manager, best known for managing Seattle rock bands such as Soundgarden, Alice in Chains and Screaming Trees. Silver also owns the company Susan Silver Management, and co-owns the club The Crocodile in Seattle. Silver was named "the most powerful figure in local rock management" by The Seattle Times in 1991.

Biography

Early life 
Silver was born in Seattle, Washington on July 17, 1958, to Samuel and Emmogene (Jean) Silver. She is the oldest of three children.

Silver majored in Chinese at the University of Washington and had been to all the major concerts in Seattle since she was 15. She started by booking for the club The Metropolis and Sub Pop co-founder Jonathan Poneman's club parties.

Career 
Silver started working as a music manager in 1983. Her first clients were the bands The U-Men and First Thought. In 1985, Silver met Soundgarden, whose lead vocalist was her then-boyfriend Chris Cornell, and in the following year she started managing the band. Back then, Silver was also managing Screaming Trees. "I became a manager because I wanted to help musicians achieve their dreams".

At the same time that she was managing Rock bands, Silver was also the manager of a John Fluevog shoe store in Seattle. The store would become famous years later for selling the Dr. Martens boots worn by several members of Grunge bands from Seattle. One of Silver's co-workers at the store at the time was Kevin Martin, lead vocalist of Candlebox.

In 1988, Silver met music manager Kelly Curtis. Curtis and his friend Ken Deans owned a company, and Deans was the manager of the band Alice in Chains. Deans gave Silver a cassette tape of Alice in Chains and she liked it. Silver then went to an Alice in Chains concert and thought they were fun and very energetic. When Curtis became interested in working with the band Mother Love Bone, Deans decided that he didn't want to work with Alice in Chains anymore, so he offered the managing job to Silver and Curtis, who started co-managing the band. Curtis and Silver passed on the Alice in Chains demo tape The Treehouse Tapes to Columbia Records' A&R representative Nick Terzo, who set up an appointment with label president Don Ienner. Based on that demo, Terzo signed Alice in Chains to Columbia in 1989. Some time later, Curtis started managing the band Pearl Jam, and Silver became the sole manager of Alice in Chains.

In May 1990, record label Sub Pop sent Nirvana a new proposed contract, but vocalist Kurt Cobain was reluctant to sign it, complaining about the label's lack of promotion for their debut album, Bleach. Cobain and bassist Krist Novoselic consulted Silver for advice, and she looked at the contract and told them they needed a lawyer. They met Silver in Los Angeles and she introduced them to agent Don Muller and music business attorney Alan Mintz, who specialized in finding deals for new bands. Mintz started sending out Nirvana's demo tape to major labels looking for deals. MCA Records expressed interest, but the band ended up choosing DGC (part of Geffen Records) following advice from Sonic Youth, and the label released their hit album Nevermind in 1991. Kurt Cobain and Krist Novoselic offered her to manage them but she refused because she was too busy with her bands. "There aren't many things I regret about my life, but of course not managing Nirvana was a mistake". When Nirvana was inducted into the Rock and Roll Hall of Fame in 2014, Novoselic thanked Silver during his speech for "introducing them to the music industry properly".

In 1995, Silver supported Krist Novoselic's political-action committee, Joint Artists and Music Promotions (JAMPAC), to defend the rights of artists and their fans.

In 1996, Silver was featured on the Doug Pray documentary Hype!, talking about the Seattle music scene.

Among Silver's clients in the 90s were the bands Hater, Inflatable Soule, Crackerbox, Sweet Water, Sponge, singer Kristen Barry, and producer Terry Date.

In 1998, Silver retired from the music business to concentrate on her family. In 2005, Silver and Deborah Semer formed a new company in Seattle, Atmosphere Artist Management. Their first client was the music and dance group Children of the Revolution.

Alice in Chains was inactive from 1996 until 2005. After lead vocalist Layne Staley died of a drug overdose in 2002, the band only performed in public again in February 2005 for a benefit concert with guest vocalists in Seattle. After that experience, the band called Silver and said they wanted to tour as Alice in Chains again. The band released their first album with new vocalist William DuVall in September 2009, Black Gives Way to Blue. The album debuted at No. 5 on the Billboard 200 chart, and was certified gold by the RIAA in 2010 for shipments in excess of 500,000 copies in the United States.

Since 2009, Silver co-manages Alice in Chains along with David Benveniste and his company Velvet Hammer Management.

Other ventures 
Since 2009, Silver co-owns the club The Crocodile in Seattle along with Alice in Chains' drummer Sean Kinney, Capitol Hill Block Party co-founder Marcus Charles, Peggy Curtis, and Portugal. The Man guitarist Eric Howk.

In 2013, Rolling Stone named The Crocodile as one of the best clubs in America, ranked at No. 7. The Guardian included the club in its list of the "Top 10 live music venues in Seattle".

On November 21, 2019, Silver interviewed writer and political activist Gloria Steinem at the Paramount Theater in Seattle when Steinem was promoting her new book, The Truth Will Set You Free, But First It Will Piss You Off!.

Personal life 
In 1985, Silver started dating Chris Cornell, the lead vocalist of Soundgarden, a band that Silver started managing a year later, and they got married in 1990. Cornell wrote the song "Moonchild" from his debut solo album Euphoria Morning for Silver. The couple's first and only child, a daughter named Lillian Jean, was born in June 2000. The couple divorced in 2004. 

Silver says: "Movement and dance... for the last 25 years, helps me physically feel better but lifts me emotionally in a profound way. I got lucky enough to get introduced to TM (Transcendental Meditation) when I was in high school so that was really important... Therapy has been really valuable for me and getting out in nature... those are the pillars for me. Having a spiritual practice… really important for me. It has been for decades and decades."

When asked about his heroes during a press conference in 2002, Alice in Chains' vocalist and guitarist Jerry Cantrell named Silver as one of his heroes. Cantrell also thanked Silver for being one of the people who helped him get into rehab during his speech at the MusiCares MAP Fund Benefit on May 31, 2012, where he was awarded the Stevie Ray Vaughan Award.

Filmography 
 1996 : Hype!, documentary
 2001 : VH1 News Special : Grunge, TV Movie documentary
 2011 : Pearl Jam Twenty, documentary
 2012 : Metal Evolution, TV Series documentary : Grunge 
 2021 : Loudwire: 30 Years of Grunge, TV Mini Series documentary : Who Invented Grunge?

References

Further reading

External links 

Susan Silver on Discogs
Susan Silver on AllMusic
Susan Silver Management on Discogs

1958 births
Living people
American music managers
Businesspeople from Seattle
University of Washington College of Arts and Sciences alumni
Alice in Chains
Soundgarden
20th-century American businesspeople
21st-century American businesspeople
20th-century American businesswomen
21st-century American businesswomen